Leicester City Under-21s are the former reserve team of Leicester City. The team mainly consists of under-21 players at the club, although senior players occasionally play in the reserve side, for instance when they are recovering from injury. The Under-21s team are managed by Ben Petty and they play in Premier League 2.

Leicester City F.C. Academy are the youth team of Leicester City directed by Jon Rudkin and managed by Adam Barradell. Leicester City's academy has held Category 1 status under the Elite Player Performance Plan since July 2013.

History
Although less famous than the likes of Manchester United or West Ham United's youth systems, the Leicester City Academy has been one of the more productive academies in the East Midlands. England internationals Peter Shilton, Gary Lineker, David Nish, Steve Whitworth, Emile Heskey, Ben Chilwell and Harvey Barnes as well as Don Revie, who played for and managed England all began their careers with the Foxes. Frank McLintock, a Scottish international, former footballer of the year and a double winning captain with Arsenal, who was described by Bob Paisley as the "player of the decade" at the end of the 1970s also came through the Foxes' ranks. Leicester's all-time top appearance makers Graham Cross and Sep Smith were also among notable products of the academy.

On 8 April 2013, Leicester City Under 21s won the newly formed 2012–13 Professional Development League 2 with a game to go, qualifying for the knockout stage. However they exited the national play-off at the semi-final stage, after losing 3–2 to Cardiff.

On 26 May 2013, the Leicester City Development Squad & Academy won the HKFC International Soccer Sevens cup, beating Newcastle United Reserves and Academy 2–0 thanks to goals from Michael Cain and Harry Panayiotou. The latter also went on to win player of the tournament. On 4 July, it was announced that Leicester City's academy had been awarded category one status, the highest level under the Premier League's Elite Player Performance Plan.

By finishing 6th in the 2013–14 Professional U21 Development League, Leicester City U21s qualified for the inaugural, 2014–15 edition, of the Premier League International Cup, being drawn in Group C with Manchester City, Benfica and Schalke 04. On 24 November 2014, Leicester City U21s became the first team to qualify for the quarter-finals, after defeating Schalke 04 and Benfica, both 2–0 at the King Power Stadium.

After having almost been relegated from Premier League 2 Division 1 in 2016–2017, Leicester Under 23s went on to finish third in PL2, while also getting to the semi-finals of the Premier League Cup. In addition, several of the under 23's gained first team experience under manager Claude Puel with Harvey Barnes and Hamza Choudhury playing prominent roles towards the end of the 2017–2018 season. This subsequently lead to Hamza Choudhury gaining his first England Under 21s cap during the Toulan Tournament.

On 13 June 2020 the club announced that long-serving coach Trevor Peake was stepping down from his role as Under-18s coach after 17 years of service. Former under 12–16 Youth Development Phase Coach Adam Barradell took responsibility of the Under-18s during the summer of 2020.

Having been in Premier League 2 Division 1 since its establishment as part of the Elite Player Performance Plan Leicester Under 23s were relegated to Division 2 on 10 May 2021 following a season that saw a number of under 23's players promoted to train with the first team due to a substantial injury list. However, following an expansion of Premier League 2 Division 2 to 14 clubs, Leicester Under 23s were reinstated to the top division for the upcoming 2021–2022 season despite finishing second from bottom during the previous season.

Players

Under 21s

Out on loan

Under 18s

Staff

Notable Graduates
Current Leicester City players in bold. Year of senior debut given in parenthesis.

Honours

U21
Premier League 2 Division 1
Runner-up: 2019–2020
U21 Professional Development League 2 North Division
 Winners (1): 2012–2013

Academy
HKFC International Soccer Sevens
Shield Winners (1): 2011–2012
Cup Winners (2): 2012–2013, 2016–2017
Plate Winners (1): 2013–2014
U15 Premier League Category 2 National Trophy
Winners (1): 2012–2013

References

Reserves and Academy
Football academies in England
Premier League International Cup
UEFA Youth League teams